Henry Hunter Hall is an American actor.

Early life 
The son of filmmaker Kasi Lemmons and actor Vondie Curtis-Hall, he appeared as a child in Curtis-Hall’s 1997 film Gridlock'd starring Tim Roth and Tupac. His uncle is fashion designer Kevan Hall.

Career 
In 2019, Hall appeared as Walter in Harriet, about the life and times of Harriet Tubman. In 2019, he joined the cast of Hunters alongside Al Pacino, Logan Lerman, Carol Kane, and Lena Olin. In 2019, Hall appeared in When They See Us.

In late-2020, Hall was reportedly signed on to a project written by Kenneth Golde, to be the directorial debut of Rich Lee, and co-starring Eva Longoria and Ice Cube.

Filmography

Film

Television

References

External links
 

Place of birth missing (living people)
Living people
American actors
Year of birth missing (living people)